Muḥammad Mu’min ibn Mīr Muḥammad Zamān Tunakābunī was a 17th-century Persian physician from Mazandaran.
 
Tunakabuni was an author on various medical and religious topics. He based his large Persian compendium of simple and compound remedies, which according to the text was composed in 1679, on Arabic authorities and on Indian sources. His treatise was dedicated to Shah Sulayman, who ruled from 1666 to 1694.  Grandfathers of him emigrated from Tonekabon to Isfahan and were special healers of the kings of the Safavid dynasty. Tunakabuni was also the special doctor of King Soleiman and had skill in medicine and language. He wrote his famous book, Tohfat AL-mo'menin, for king Soleiman.

See also
List of Iranian scientists

References

Sources
For his medical writings, see:

 C.A. Storey, Persian Literature: A Bio-Bibliographical Survey. Volume II, Part 2: E.Medicine (London: Royal Asiatic Society, 1971), p. 261-3 no. 448
Lutz Richter-Bernburg, Persian Medical Manuscripts at the University of California, Los Angeles: A Descriptive Catalogue, Humana Civilitas, vol. 4 (Malibu: Udena Publications, 1978), pp. 128–31
Fateme Keshavarz, A Descriptive and Analytical Catalogue of Persian Manuscripts in the Library of the Wellcome Institute for the History of Medicine (London: Wellcome Institute for the History of Medicine, 1986) p. 268
A.Z. Iskandar, A Descriptive List of Arabic Manuscripts on Medicine and Science at the University of California, Los Angeles (Leiden: Brill, 1984). p. 36.

17th-century Iranian physicians
Pharmacologists of medieval Iran
People from Tonekabon
17th-century writers of Safavid Iran